"Brothers & Sisters" is a song by British rock band Coldplay. It was released as their debut single by Fierce Panda Records in 26 April 1999, following the extended play Safety (1998). The single peaked at number 92 on the UK Singles Chart and 1,500 copies of its vinyl edition were issued in a special wrap-around picture sleeve. It was re-released as an extended play by Brash Records in 2002.

Background
Following the band's performance at the Camden Falcon in December 1998, Fierce Panda Records founder Simon Williams was the first journalist to write about Coldplay and offered the band to release their debut single in his label through a short record deal.

Recording and versions
According to the single's liner notes, recording was completed in only four days and cost the band £400. The atmospheric sounds on the B-side track "Easy to Please" were created by setting up microphones on a wet road outside the studio. There are three versions of "Brothers & Sisters": the first and original one can be found on the "Ode to Deodorant" promo cassette, from 1998. The second is this release from 1999. The third and final version appeared as a B-side of the single "Trouble", from the band's debut album Parachutes.

Track listing

Personnel
 Chris Martin – vocals, acoustic guitar, piano
 Jonny Buckland – lead guitar 
 Guy Berryman – bass guitar 
 Will Champion – drums

Charts

References

External links 

1999 debut singles
1999 songs
Coldplay songs
Songs written by Guy Berryman
Songs written by Jonny Buckland
Songs written by Will Champion
Songs written by Chris Martin
Song recordings produced by Ken Nelson (British record producer)
Song recordings produced by Chris Allison
Fierce Panda Records singles